Aldo Silvani (21 January 1891 – 12 November 1964) was an Italian film actor. He appeared in more than 110 films between 1934 and 1964. He was born in Turin, Italy and died in Milan, Italy.

Selected filmography

 Cardinal Lambertini (1934)
 The Ancestor (1936)
 The Three Wishes (1937)
 The King of England Will Not Pay (1941)
 Carmela (1942)
 The Jester's Supper (1942)
 The Two Orphans (1942)
 Four Steps in the Clouds (1942)
 Lively Teresa (1943)
 Anything for a Song (1943)
 Maria Malibran (1943)
 The Son of the Red Corsair (1943)
 Romulus and the Sabines (1945)
 L'abito nero da sposa (1945)
 The Ten Commandments (1945)
 Life Begins Anew (1945)
 The Ways of Sin (1946)
 The Courier of the King (1947)
 To Live in Peace (1947)
 The Captain's Daughter (1947)
 Difficult Years (1948)
 Mad About Opera (1948)
 Little Lady (1949)
 A Night of Fame (1949)
 Sicilian Uprising (1949)
 Chains (1949)
 Paolo e Francesca (1950)
 L' Amore di Norma (1950)
 The Merry Widower (1950)
 Song of Spring (1951)
 Tomorrow Is Another Day (1951)
 The Mad Marechiaro (1952)
 Noi peccatori (1953)
 La pattuglia dell'Amba Alagi (1953)
 For You I Have Sinned (1953)
 Beat the Devil (1953) as Charles, restaurant owner
 Casta Diva (1954)
 On Trial (1954)
 The Lovers of Manon Lescaut (1954)
 La Strada (1954)
 House of Ricordi (1954)
 Desperate Farewell (1955)
 Rigoletto e la sua tragedia (1956)
 Nights of Cabiria (1957)
 Ben Hur (1959) as Man in Nazareth (uncredited)
 Carthage in Flames (1960)
 Damon and Pythias (1962)

References

External links

1891 births
1964 deaths
Italian male film actors
Actors from Turin
20th-century Italian male actors